In molecular biology, SNORD78 (also known as U78) belongs to the C/D family of snoRNAs. It is predicted to guide 2'O-ribose methylation of the large 28S rRNA subunit at position G4593.
The snoRNAs U44, U47, U74, U75, U76, U77, U79, U80 and U81, also of the C/D family, share the same host gene with U78 (protein non-coding).

References

External links 
 

Small nuclear RNA